Khalishpur is a Metropolitan thana of Khulna Metropolitan Police in the Division of Khulna, Bangladesh.

Geography
It has 35343 households and total area 12.35 km2.

Demographics
In the 1991 Bangladesh census, Khalishpur had a population of 173255. Males constituted 55.95% of the population, and females 44.05%. Population over the age of 18 was 96193. Khalishpur had an average literacy rate of 59.8% (7+ years), above the national average of 32.4%.

, the population was 165,299.

Administration
Khalishpur has 9 Unions/Wards, 40 Mauzas/Mahallas, and 0 villages.

See also
 Upazilas of Bangladesh
 Districts of Bangladesh
 Divisions of Bangladesh

References

Upazilas of Khulna District